Przysucha  is a town in south-central Poland. Located in historic Lesser Poland, it is part of the Masovian Voivodeship, about 100 km southwest of Warsaw and 40 km west of Radom. It is the capital of Przysucha County, and the town 6,762 inhabitants (2004). In the past, it was home to a number of Hasidic Rabbis, such as The Holy Jew and Simcha Bunim of Peshischa.

Przysucha is located on the Radomka river, along national road nr. 12 (which in the future will make Expressway S12). Rail station Przysucha is located in the village of Skrzyńsko, on the line from Radom to Łódź.

History

First mention of Przesucha, as it was known then, comes from 1415. In the early 16th century, the village belonged to the Morsztyn family. Przysucha had a public house, a watermill, and a forge, and it belonged to the parish of Skrzyńsko. On December 11, 1710, upon a royal privilege, issued by King Augustus II the Strong, artisans were allowed to settle in the town, and a weekly market was established. Later on, two markets a week were permitted, and a manufactory was opened in town, along the Radomka river.

German artisans from Silesia and Saxony founded in the early 18th century a settlement called Czermno, which today is part of Przysucha. In Przysucha itself, the number of Jews rapidly grew. At that time, the town was a major center of Hasidism. In 1777, Przysucha had 39 German, 85 Jewish, and 29 Polish houses. The town was divided into three parts - Germans lived in Czermno, Jews in Przysucha, and Poles - in Urszulin. Przysucha also was one of centers of early industry. In the late 18th century, it had a blast furnace, a sawmill, and a paper mill. Since its origins to 1795 Przysucha belonged to Sandomierz Voivodeship.

After the Partitions of Poland, the period of prosperity ended. Przysucha remained a private town, and its industry was obsolete. In 1870, Tsarist authorities deprived Przysucha of its town rights. 

Przysucha was a center of Chassidic Judaism. Seven important Hasidic rebbes are buried in the town's Jewish cemetery, established soon after Jews settled in the area in 1713. The Przysucha Synagogue was built between 1764 and 1777, and is the largest extant baroque synagogue in Poland. 

Jews numbered 2,980 out of 4,850 residents in 1939. During World War II, Przysucha was bombed on September 6, 1939, when 70 houses were destroyed. Germans opened a ghetto with more than 5,000 Jews and murdered most of them at the Treblinka extermination camp.

Underground resistance was strong in Przysucha and the county. On September 6, 1944, German forces lost 140 soldiers, and 230 were wounded in a battle near the village of Stefanów. Soviet troops entered the town on January 17, 1945.

Since World War II
Immediately after the war, Przysucha had 1,500 inhabitants. In 1956 it became the seat of a county, and two years later it regained its town rights. During Communist times, several enterprises were opened there - clay mine, ceramics factory, fruit and vegetable processor. 
 
Among points of interest are:
 classicist parish church (1780-1786),
 19th century houses,
 Dembiński Manor House - currently a museum,
 Jewish cemetery,
 monument of Polish soldiers in a town square.

References

External links

 Przysucha local government webpage
Przysucha on the map, via www.pilot.pl
 Jewish Community in Przysucha on Virtual Shtetl

Cities and towns in Masovian Voivodeship
Przysucha County
Radom Governorate
Łódź Voivodeship (1919–1939)
Holocaust locations in Poland